Richard Charles Pierce (born August 19, 1959) is an American retired National Basketball Association (NBA) player. Nicknamed "Deuces" and "Big Paper Daddy", he was selected as an NBA All-Star (1991) and was twice the NBA Sixth Man of the Year (1987, 1990) while with the Milwaukee Bucks.

Career beginnings
Pierce graduated from Garland High School. He later played basketball at Walla Walla Community College and Rice University.

Pierce is first in Rice history in career scoring average at 22.5 points per game, while he is third all time in total points scored and second in total field goals made. His 1981-82 season of 26.8 points, 314 field goals made, and 614 field goals attempted are also school single season records.

NBA

Detroit Pistons 
Pierce was drafted by the Detroit Pistons in the 1st round (18th pick) of the 1982 NBA Draft. Used sparingly in his rookie season, he was traded to the San Diego Clippers immediately prior to the 1983-84 NBA season for two future 2nd round draft picks.

San Diego Clippers
Pierce became a rotation regular during his one season with the Clippers, averaging 9.9 points and 18.6 minutes per game. He started 35 games during the season, highlighted by a then-career-high 30-point performance against San Antonio in his first start as a Clipper.

Milwaukee Bucks 
Pierce was traded by the San Diego Clippers before the 1984-85 season along with Terry Cummings to the Milwaukee Bucks. The trade, which also brought Craig Hodges to Milwaukee, while sending veterans Junior Bridgeman and Marques Johnson (both would eventually have their jerseys retired in Milwaukee) to the Clippers, is viewed as having worked much better for the Bucks than the Clippers.

Pierce was reunited with his coach at Rice, Mike Schuler, who was then an assistant coach for the Bucks. Pierce would go on to average 17 points per game over the next 6 full seasons in Milwaukee, despite starting only 46 games in that time.

On March 13, 1985, Pierce scored 22 points, grabbed 9 rebounds, and recorded 6 assists in a win against the Cleveland Cavaliers. Pierce and the Bucks would go on to beat Michael Jordan and the Bulls 3-1 in the first round of the playoffs, before being upset by the lower seeded Philadelphia 76ers in the Eastern Conference Semifinals.

Pierce won the NBA Sixth Man of the Year Award for 1986–87 for averaging 19.5 points per game with a 53.4% shooting percentage in his third season with the Bucks. That same postseason, on May 8, 1987, Pierce led the Bucks with 29 points off the bench in a Game 3 victory against Boston Celtics, however, Boston would ultimately win the series. During the 1989 NBA Playoffs, on May 2, Pierce led the Bucks to 117-113 Game 3 victory over the Atlanta Hawks with a team-high 35 points. The Bucks would win the series 3-2, before being eliminated in the next round by the eventual-champion Pistons. 

The following season, Pierce earned the Sixth Man award again, averaging 23.0 points per game without starting a single one (an NBA record) in 1989–90. That season, on November 9, 1989, Pierce played a key role in the longest game in the shot clock era, at four hours and 17 minutes, scoring a team leading 36 points on 15 of 21 shooting, during a 155-154 5OT win. On December 5, Pierce scored a career-high 45 points in a loss against the Sacramento Kings. In the week preceding the 1991 trade deadline, the Bucks traded Pierce to the Seattle SuperSonics for Dale Ellis.

When asked about referring to himself as a “hired gun” in relation to being a designated scorer who bounced around on several teams, Pierce said “The teams would let you know that you were hired to play a certain role. That was the role that I took on, my strength, my scoring ability. That was what I focused on. One time, in the middle of a game, I was passing the ball a lot. Coach Don Nelson called a timeout. He told me ‘I have Paul Pressey to pass. Your job is to score the ball.’ I thought that was kind of cool. I really liked that.”

Seattle Supersonics 
Pierce became a regular starter in the 1991–92 season, his first full season with the Sonics. He made 75 consecutive free throws through several games in November–December 1991, the second-longest such streak at that time. The same year, in 1992, Pierce led Seattle in scoring during both the regular and post seasons. In the 1993 NBA playoffs, Pierce led the Sonics to 103-100 Game 7 win in the conference semifinals over the Houston Rockets with a game-leading 25 points. In the next round, Pierce, alongside teammates Gary Payton and Shawn Kemp, lost in seven games to the Phoenix Suns, narrowly missing an NBA Finals appearance. Pierce returned to the bench for 1993–94 following Seattle's off-season acquisition of Kendall Gill.

Golden State Warriors 
On July 18, 1994, Pierce was traded along with Carlos Rogers and two draft picks to the Golden State Warriors in exchange for Byron Houston and Sarunas Marciulionis. Pierce battled foot and back injuries during the season and was only able to see action in 27 games.

Indiana Pacers 
Prior to the 1995–96 season, Pierce signed with the Indiana Pacers as an unrestricted free agent. Healthy once more, Pierce appeared in 76 games, and after starting only 2 games all season, he started 4 of the Pacers' 5 first round playoff games, contributing 10.2 points and 3.0 assists per game.

Denver Nuggets 
Indiana traded Pierce to the Denver Nuggets before the start of 1996–97 season, sending Mark Jackson and a 1st round draft pick to the Nuggets in exchange for Jalen Rose, Reggie Williams, and the Nuggets' 1st round pick. In February, with the Nuggets out of the playoff picture, Pierce was traded to the Charlotte Hornets for Anthony Goldwire and George Zidek.

Charlotte Hornets 
Pierce played an expanded role with the playoff-bound Hornets, starting 17 of the final 29 games and averaging 12 points per game. In the playoffs, Pierce started the first 2 games of the Hornets' series with the New York Knicks and contributed 11 points off the bench in the third, which would be his final playoff game as a player.

AEK BC Athens, return to the Bucks and retirement 
Without a contract for the 1997–98 season, Pierce signed to play with AEK B.C. Athens, a Greek professional team and one of the best in the country. Pierce played five games with AEK before signing as a free agent with the Milwaukee Bucks in December 1997. On December 19, Pierce scored 13 points in a 92-91 loss against the Toronto Raptors. He retired from basketball at the end of the season.

NBA career statistics

Regular season 

|-
| style="text-align:left;"| 
| style="text-align:left;"|Detroit
| 39 || 1 || 6.8 || .375 || .143 || .563 || .9 || .4 || .2 || .1 || 2.2
|-
| style="text-align:left;"| 
| style="text-align:left;"|San Diego
| 69 || 35 || 18.6 || .470 || .000 || .861 || 2.0 || .9 || .4 || .2 || 9.9
|-
| style="text-align:left;"| 
| style="text-align:left;"|Milwaukee
| 44 || 3 || 20.0 || .537 || .250 || .823 || 2.7 || 2.1 || .8 || .1 || 9.8
|-
| style="text-align:left;"| 
| style="text-align:left;"|Milwaukee
| 81 || 8 || 26.5 || .538 || .130 || .858 || 2.9 || 2.2 || 1.0 || .1 || 13.9
|-
| style="text-align:left;"| 
| style="text-align:left;"|Milwaukee
| 79 || 31 || 31.7 || .534 || .107 || .880 || 3.4 || 1.8 || .8 || .3 || 19.5
|-
| style="text-align:left;"| 
| style="text-align:left;"|Milwaukee
| 37 || 0 || 26.1 || .510 || .214 || .877 || 2.2 || 2.0 || .6 || .2 || 16.4
|-
| style="text-align:left;"| 
| style="text-align:left;"|Milwaukee
| 75 || 4 || 27.7 || .518 || .222 || .859 || 2.6 || 2.1 || 1.0 || .3 || 17.6
|-
| style="text-align:left;"| 
| style="text-align:left;"|Milwaukee
| 59 || 0 || 29.0 || .510 || .346 || .839 || 2.8 || 2.3 || .8 || .1 || 23.0
|-
| style="text-align:left;"| 
| style="text-align:left;"|Milwaukee
| 46 || 0 || 28.8 || .499 || .398 || .907 || 2.5 || 2.1 || .8 || .2 || 22.5
|-
| style="text-align:left;"| 
| style="text-align:left;"|Seattle
| 32 || 0 || 26.3 || .463 || .391 || .925 || 2.3 || 2.3 || .7 || .1 || 17.5
|-
| style="text-align:left;"| 
| style="text-align:left;"|Seattle
| 78 || 78 || 34.1 || .475 || .268 || .916 || 3.0 || 3.1 || 1.1 || .3 || 21.7
|-
| style="text-align:left;"| 
| style="text-align:left;"|Seattle
| 77 || 72 || 28.8 || .489 || .372 || .889 || 2.5 || 2.9 || 1.3 || .1 || 18.2
|-
| style="text-align:left;"| 
| style="text-align:left;"|Seattle
| 51 || 0 || 20.0 || .471 || .188 || .896 || 1.6 || 1.8 || .8 || .1 || 14.5
|-
| style="text-align:left;"| 
| style="text-align:left;"|Golden State
| 27 || 6 || 24.9 || .437 || .329 || .877 || 2.4 || 1.5 || .8 || .1 || 12.5
|-
| style="text-align:left;"| 
| style="text-align:left;"|Indiana
| 76 || 2 || 18.5 || .447 || .337 || .849 || 1.8 || 1.3 || .8 || .1 || 9.7
|-
| style="text-align:left;"| 
| style="text-align:left;"|Denver
| 33 || 10 || 18.2 || .462 || .308 || .902 || 1.6 || .9 || .4 || .2 || 10.2
|-
| style="text-align:left;"| 
| style="text-align:left;"|Charlotte
| 27 || 17 || 24.1 || .502 || .536 || .889 || 2.5 || 1.8 || .5 || .1 || 12.0
|-
| style="text-align:left;"| 
| style="text-align:left;"|Milwaukee
| 39 || 0 || 11.3 || .364 || .308 || .827 || 1.2 || .9 || .2 || .0 || 3.9
|- class="sortbottom"
| style="text-align:center;" colspan="2"| Career
| 969 || 269 || 24.4 || .493 || .322 || .875 || 2.4 || 1.9 || .8 || .2 || 14.9
|- class="sortbottom"
| style="text-align:center;" colspan="2"| All-Star
| 1 || 0 || 19.0 || .500 || – || 1.000 || 2.0 || 2.0 || .0 || .0 || 9.0

Playoffs 

|-
|style="text-align:left;"|1985
|style="text-align:left;"|Milwaukee
|8||1||24.8||.493||.000||.778||2.3||1.9||.4||.1||9.9
|-
|style="text-align:left;"|1986
|style="text-align:left;"|Milwaukee
|13||0||24.8||.460||.000||.889||2.8||1.5||.6||.2||11.1
|-
|style="text-align:left;"|1987
|style="text-align:left;"|Milwaukee
|12||2||26.4||.479||–||.821||2.3||1.3||.8||.4||15.9
|-
|style="text-align:left;"|1988
|style="text-align:left;"|Milwaukee
|5||0||21.0||.472||.200||.889||2.8||1.8||.2||.4||11.8
|-
|style="text-align:left;"|1989
|style="text-align:left;"|Milwaukee
|9||0||32.4||.546||.750||.872||2.8||2.8||1.2||.2||22.3
|-
|style="text-align:left;"|1990
|style="text-align:left;"|Milwaukee
|4||0||30.5||.467||.500||.903||2.3||1.5||1.3||.0||22.3
|-
|style="text-align:left;"|1991
|style="text-align:left;"|Seattle
|5||0||22.4||.333||.300||.941||2.8||.8||.8||.2||11.4
|-
|style="text-align:left;"|1992
|style="text-align:left;"|Seattle
|9||9||35.1||.481||.273||.870||2.4||3.1||.6||.1||19.6
|-
|style="text-align:left;"|1993
|style="text-align:left;"|Seattle
|19||19||30.4||.456||.400||.898||2.4||2.2||.6||.2||17.7
|-
|style="text-align:left;"|1994
|style="text-align:left;"|Seattle
|5||0||14.8||.452||–||.706||1.0||.6||.2||.0||8.0
|-
|style="text-align:left;"|1996
|style="text-align:left;"|Indiana
|5||4||26.6||.340||.250||.850||.8||3.0||1.6||.2||10.2
|-
|style="text-align:left;"|1997
|style="text-align:left;"|Charlotte
|3||2||29.0||.458||.143||–||2.7||1.3||.7||.0||7.7
|- class="sortbottom"
| style="text-align:center;" colspan="2"| Career
| 97 || 37 || 27.4 || .466 || .355 || .866 || 2.4 || 1.9 || .7 || .2 || 14.9

Post playing career
Since retiring, Pierce has developed his own basketball system that assists with shooting accuracy with specially-designed fingertip-placement markers. Pierce developed the idea after watching his son, Aron, playing basketball at the YMCA. Pierce was giving advice to parents on how to teach their kids the perfect jump shot.  A product would later be developed known as the Accushot22, a specially designed basketball with 10 oval indentations. The product sells for $37.95, although hundreds are given away free to underprivileged children.

In 2015, Pierce was inducted into the Southwest Conference Hall of Fame, becoming only the third Rice basketball player to be inducted.

Personal life
Pierce is a Christian. Pierce is married to Joyce Pierce. They have three children.

Pierce returned to Rice University to complete his degree, and graduated with a Bachelor of Arts in kinesiology in May 2012.

Notes

External links
 (selected season stats and career highs)
Ricky Pierce biography by the NBA

1959 births
Living people
20th-century African-American sportspeople
21st-century African-American people
21st-century American inventors
AEK B.C. players
African-American basketball players
African-American inventors
All-American college men's basketball players
American expatriate basketball people in Greece
American men's basketball players
Basketball players from Dallas
Charlotte Hornets players
Denver Nuggets players
Detroit Pistons draft picks
Detroit Pistons players
Garland High School alumni
Golden State Warriors players
Greek Basket League players
Indiana Pacers players
Junior college men's basketball players in the United States
Milwaukee Bucks players
National Basketball Association All-Stars
People from Garland, Texas
Rice Owls men's basketball players
San Diego Clippers players
Seattle SuperSonics players
Shooting guards
Walla Walla Community College alumni